SVN Notifier is a tool to monitor one's Subversion project repository for changes. SVN Notifier notifies a person about recent commits and helps you keep one's local copy up to date. A person reviews all the changes and updates their local copy right from the application.  It is free software released under the GNU General Public License.  It uses SVN, TortoiseSVN and Microsoft .NET Framework 2.0.

Comparison with other tools 

SVN Notifier differs from the tool CommitMonitor in that it watches repository URLs via working copies rather than directly. SVN Notifier is tightly integrated with TortoiseSVN. It implements the "monitoring/notification" feature only (that is missing in TortoiseSVN) and thus has a very simple user interface.

See also 
 Subversion
 TortoiseSVN
 CommitMonitor
 Comparison of Subversion clients

References

External links 

Apache Subversion
Windows-only free software